Jack D. Evans (birth year unknown) is a Welsh former rugby union and professional rugby league footballer who played in the 1940s and 1950s.

International honours
Jack Evans won 10 caps for Wales (RL) in 1950–1953 while at Hunslet, and won caps for Great Britain (RL) while at Hunslet in 1951 against New Zealand; and in 1952 against Australia (3 matches).

Jack Evans also represented Great Britain in two non-Test matches while at Hunslet in the 12-22 defeat by France at Parc des Princes, Paris on Thursday 22 May 1952, and the 17-22 defeat by France at Stade de Gerland, Lyon on Sunday 24 May 1953.

References

External links
Great Britain Statistics at englandrl.co.uk (statistics currently missing due to not having appeared for both Great Britain, and England)

Footballers who switched code
Great Britain national rugby league team players
Hunslet F.C. (1883) players
Newport RFC players
Place of birth missing
Possibly living people
Rugby league fullbacks
Rugby league players from Newport, Wales
Rugby union players from Newport, Wales
Wales national rugby league team captains
Wales national rugby league team players
Welsh rugby league players
Welsh rugby union players
Year of birth missing